Sir Harry Wyatt Wunderly (30 May 1892 – 14 April 1971) was an Australian army medical officer, general practitioner, medical administrator, physician and public servant. Wunderly was born in Hawthorn, Melbourne, Victoria and died in Canberra, Australian Capital Territory.  Wunderly was instrumental in the management and reduction of tuberculosis in Australia.

References

Australian general practitioners
Australian Army officers
Australian military doctors
Australian Methodists
Australian people of English descent
1892 births
1971 deaths
People from Hawthorn, Victoria
Medical doctors from Melbourne